The 117th United States Congress began on January 3, 2021. There were six new senators (two Democrats, four Republicans) and 60 new representatives (15 Democrats, 45 Republicans) at the start of the first session. Additionally, three senators (all Democrats) and 16 representatives (six Democrats, ten Republicans) took office on various dates in order to fill vacancies during the 117th Congress before it ended on January 3, 2023.

One representative-elect, Luke Letlow of Louisiana, died before taking office.

The president of the House Democratic freshman class was Nikema Williams of Georgia, while the president of the House Republican freshman class was Stephanie Bice of Oklahoma. Additionally, the Democratic Freshmen Leadership Representative was Mondaire Jones of New York, and the Republican's freshmen liaison was Andrew Clyde of Georgia.

Senate

Took office January 3, 2021

Took office during the 117th Congress

House of Representatives

Took office January 3, 2021

Took office during the 117th Congress

See also 
 List of United States senators in the 117th Congress
 List of members of the United States House of Representatives in the 117th Congress by seniority

Notes

References 

Freshman class members
117